Rookie Agent Rouge  is 2016 Chinese television series directed by Xu Zizhou, starring Zhao Liying and Lu Yi. The series aired on Dragon TV and Zhejiang TV from 27 September to 21 October 2016. The drama is currently licensed by Netflix.

Synopsis 
Lan Yanzhi (Rouge) is a privileged banker's daughter in Shanghai and a student activist who mistakenly comes into possession of a letter from the Japanese Army in 1937. Song Mian, an undercover agent for the Kuomintang, mistakes her for a spy. To prove her innocence, Yan Zhi agrees to infiltrate the home of her best friend, Feng Man'na, and help Song Mian track down a mysterious traitor. Finding the spy turns Yan Zhi and Man'na from friends to bitter enemies, as both get involved in the confused fighting in late 1930s Shanghai featuring Japanese, Nationalists and Communists. Unusually, the chief Japanese agent, Aoki, is very sympathetically portrayed.

Cast

Main 
 Zhao Liying as Lan Yanzhi
 Lu Yi as Zhou Yuhao
 Tao Xinran as Feng Man'na
 Mickey Yuan as Song Mian

Supporting 
 Shu Yaoxuan as Lan Changming, Yan Zhi's father
 Ma Cancan as Lin Tianmu 
 Zhao Shuting
 Wang Zichen as Zhang Guosheng
 Gao Xin as Ying Zi / Zhou Hanguang

Soundtrack

Ratings 

 Highest ratings are marked in red, lowest ratings are marked in blue

Awards and nominations

References

External links

Chinese espionage television series
Chinese period television series
2016 Chinese television series debuts
Mandarin-language television shows
Dragon Television original programming
Zhejiang Television original programming
Television series by New Classics Media
Second Sino-Japanese War television drama series